Wang Liping may refer to:

Wang Liping (Taoist) (born 1949), Chinese Taoist
Wang Liping (footballer) (born 1973), Chinese footballer
Wang Liping (racewalker) (born 1976), Chinese race walker
Wang Liping (politician), former chairman of Shanghai CPPCC
Wang Li-ping (born 1962), Taiwanese activist and politician